The maisons d'éducation de la Légion d'honneur were the French secondary schools set up by Napoleon and originally meant for the education of girls whose father, grandfather or great-grandfather had been awarded the Légion d'honneur. Access is still by hereditary right.

History 
It is impossible not to make a link between the Maisons d'éducation de la Légion d'honneur and the "Maison royale de Saint-Louis" founded by Madame de Maintenon in Saint-Cyr (now Saint-Cyr-l'École) and built by Jules Hardouin Mansart, which was used later by Napoleon as a school for officers of the French army. Napoleon knew the Maison royale de Saint-Louis, because his sister Élisa Bonaparte studied there and he took her out of the school in 1792. There are many similarities between the two schools: being linked to the Légion d'honneur which inherits from the "Ordre de Saint Louis", being designed for daughters of poor officers or noblemen, being divided in classes identified by a color ribbon, etc. However, there are also differences, like the fact that the Maisons d'éducation, or at least some of them, were ruled by nuns, and it is known that Napoleon didn't want the school to look like the Maison royale, of which he had a bad opinion : 

During Napoleon's reign as Emperor of the French, there were many military schools that educated boys to make them soldiers, but the girls' education was neglected, as the National Convention had closed all convents which ensured education for girls. Napoleon created the Maisons d'éducation de la Légion d'honneur to take care of the daughters - among whom many were orphans - of his best soldiers and educate them. His first project was to create a school both for sons and daughters of the soldiers dead in the Battle of Austerlitz, but this project, presented on December 7, 1805, was finally cancelled.

The decree creating the Maisons d'éducation de la Légion d'honneur was signed by Napoleon on December 15, 1805, in the Schönbrunn Palace. It allowed the creation of three schools where daughters of members of the Légion d'honneur could enter if they were between 7 and 10 years old, and went out of them at 21.

Napoleon appointed Jeanne-Louise-Henriette Campan, former reader of the daughters of Louis XV and lady of the bedchamber of Queen Marie-Antoinette, headmistress of the first Maison d'éducation de la Légion d'Honneur. From 1794, Mrs Campan had ruled a boarding school for girls in Saint-Germain-en-Laye and had had among her pupils Hortense de Beauharnais, Stéphanie de Beauharnais, Pauline Bonaparte and Caroline Bonaparte. She wanted Napoleon to set the school in Saint-Germain, but he chose the "Château d'Écouen", which had been a property of the Légion d'honneur since July 6, 1806.

In a letter dated May 15, 1807, Napoleon described the principles of the education that should be given to the girls :  He required simple studies, aiming to "master vanity, which is the most active passion of the (female) gender" and make the pupils grow up as modest mothers and wives.

On March 25, 1809, Napoleon signed a decree to create a second Maison d'éducation de la Légion d'honneur, in the Basilica of St Denis which had been made property of France in 1790. The school was inaugurated on July 1, 1811, but the first boarders entered it in 1812.

On July 15, 1810, another decree of Napoleon created the "Maisons d'orphelines de la Légion d'honneur", which were opened to orphan daughters of members of the Légion d'honneur, whatever their grade in the army or in the order. These schools were ruled by nuns of the "Congrégation de la Mère de Dieu". Three of them were created : one in the "Hôtel de Corberon" in Paris (opened in winter 1811), the former convent of Augustines of "Les Loges" in Saint-Germain-en-Laye (opened in spring 1812) and the "Abbaye de Barbeaux" in Fontainebleau (opened in July 1813). A decree of King Louis XVIII closed these schools on July 19, 1814, but they were re-opened on September 17, 1814, on request of widows of officers to Louis XVIII, except for the "Abbaye de Barbeaux" which remained closed.

In 1821, the schools were re-organized: the school of Saint-Denis admitted only superior officers' daughters, while the other schools, considered as "annexes", admitted daughters of lower grade soldiers.

In 1881, the laws of Jules Ferry about education forced the religious schools to become lay. In 1890, the Maisons d'éducation started to follow different curricula: "Les Loges" gave a manual and professional education, Écouen prepared to commercial and teaching careers, while Saint-Denis prepared to superior studies.

In 1920, the Maisons d'éducation de la Légion d'honneur started following the same curriculum as the French lycées. The youngest girls studied in "Les Loges", the older ones in Écouen and the oldest ones in Saint-Denis. It is still the same nowadays : "Les Loges" follows the curriculum of collège while Saint-Denis is a lycée.

Écouen 

The "Château d'Écouen" was the place where the first Maison d'éducation de la Légion d'Honneur was founded. It welcomed its first boarders on November 17, 1807, with Jeanne-Louise-Henriette Campan being the headmistress of the school, having been appointed by Napoleon on September 5, 1807. Yet, the first rules of the school were only published in 1809.

In 1814, King Louis XVIII gave the castle back to the Princes of Condé, who left it uninhabited from 1830 ; the castle's property was transferred back to the Légion d'honneur in 1838.

In 1851, the former "Maison des orphelines de la Légion d'honneur" of the "Hôtel de Corberon" in Paris, which had become an "annex" of the school of Saint-Denis in 1821, was moved to the Château d'Écouen by Napoleon III.

In 1962, the Grand Chancellor of the Légion d'honneur closed the school of Écouen and gave the castle to the Ministry of Culture, to make it the National Museum of the Renaissance.

Saint-Denis 

Inaugurated on July 1, 1811, the Maison d'éducation de la Légion d'honneur of Saint-Denis was ruled by Madame du Bouzet, the widow of a colonel dead at the Battle of Jemappes. The first boarders came in 1812.

From 1820 to 1837, the headmistress was Marie-Benoîte-Joséphine de Prévost de la Croix.

On September 1, 1989, Saint-Denis opened a class of "Lettres Supérieures" (also called hypokhâgne), and on September 1, 1994, a class of "Première Supérieure" (khâgne) followed. On September 1, 1990, the school opened a class of "Brevet de Technicien Supérieur" (BTS) in international business, with an option of preparation to business schools.

Nowadays the school, set in the cloister of the former Basilica of St Denis, has about 500 pupils of lycée and the classes of hypokhâgne, khâgne and BTS.

The buildings are not opened to public but can be visited during the European Heritage Days. The school  buildings are sometimes used to shoot films : for example, it was used to represent the "Institut des Aveugles de Duroc" in the French film Les Femmes de l'ombre.

The refectory holds a painting called Le Martyre de saint Denis, de saint Eleuthère et de saint Rustique from the Flemish painter Caspar de Crayer.

Les Loges 
In 1811, at the arrival of its first boarders, the "Maison d'orphelines de la Légion d'honneur" of "Les Loges" in Saint-Germain-en-Laye was ruled by Madame de Lezeau, a superior of the "Congrégation de la Mère de Dieu". In 1814, King Louis XVIII closed the "Maisons d'orphelines", but the school was re-opened the same year, and in 1821 it became a Maison d'éducation annex to Saint-Denis.

In the forest of Saint-Germain-en-Laye, near the Camp des Loges, the school houses about 500 students of collège.

Conditions of admission 
The Maisons d'éducation de la Légion d'honneur are public, non-confessional (there is a Catholic and Protestant chaplaincy for the boarders who need to practise their religion), girls-only schools. They are open, in order of priority, to:
 Daughters, granddaughters and great-granddaughters of members of the Légion d'honneur
 Daughters, granddaughters and great-granddaughters of people who have received the Médaille militaire
 Daughters, granddaughters and great-granddaughters of members of the Ordre national du Mérite
 Daughters and granddaughters of foreign members of the Légion d'honneur (on agreement of the Grand Master of the Légion d'honneur)

Boarders must be at least 10 years old when they enter the school. They cannot be, during the year of their admission, more than:
 12 years old in sixième
 13 years old in cinquième
 14 years old in quatrième
 15 years old in troisième
 16 years old in seconde
 17 years old in première
 18 years old in terminale
The school fees for school year 2007-2008 were €1740 a year in the secondary classes and €1902 a year in the superior classes. A third of the fees must be paid each trimester, and each trimester must be paid entirely, even if the student leaves before its end.

Scholarships are not accepted in the Maisons d'éducation de la Légion d'honneur. Yet, low-income families may be granted a discount on the school fees, calculated from their revenues.

Admission requests must be sent before March 15 for superior classes and before April 15 for secondary classes. The Maisons d'éducation de la Légion d'honneur reply around May 15 to indicate if the student is admitted.

Boarding school 
All students of the Maisons d'éducation de la Légion d'honneur are boarders; the boarding school is now closed during the weekends. Each student in secondary school must have a "correspondant" living in Île-de-France and who is in charge of taking her out of school for weekends and holidays. In superior classes, the students have the choice of being boarders and being allowed to go out alone, or being in internat externé, which means they have lunch and dinner in the school, but live outside it.

Uniforms 

School uniform is compulsory in all Maisons d'éducation de la Légion d'honneur. The uniform changed several times since the school's creation ; its last modification was in September 2007.

The uniform is composed of a navy blue sleeveless dress, and a white blouse with short sleeves in summer and long sleeves in winter. The uniform is tied with a sash whose color represents the student's class :
 green in sixième
 violet in cinquième
 "aurore" (orange) in quatrième
 blue in troisième
 "nacarat" (red) in seconde
 white in première
 multicolored (with all colors of the lower grades) in terminale
Students also wear a beret and a navy blue coat with golden buttons to go out.

Students often call a fellow student or a class of the Maisons d'éducation de la Légion d'honneur using the color of the sash : for example a student in sixième can be called "une verte" (a green), the class of troisième can be called "les bleues" (the blue).

Students of superior classes wear a navy blue suit with a badge; the badge is yellow in khâgne and blue in the "Brevet de technicien supérieur" class.

The uniform can be purchased when the student enters the school, and like the school fees, it is paid in three thirds at the beginning of each trimester, even if the family is granted reduced school fees. In schoolyear 2007-2008, it cost €438 for a secondary school student and €408 for a superior class student.

Education 
Article R122 of the "Code de la Légion d'honneur" says :

The Maisons d'éducation de la Légion d'honneur follow the curriculum of the French "Éducation nationale". The teachers are appointed to the Grand Chancellor by the Ministry of Education.

Each collège grade has a "choir" option, where students are given extra lessons in choral singing and learn to play different music instruments. The school also holds studios where the students can play music freely when they have no lessons. The choir students take part in concerts and sing in official ceremonies. Each year, they give the "Concert présidentiel" or "Concert du président" to the President of France or his representative.

Much importance is given to foreign languages in the curriculum : from the sixième, two languages (English and German) can be studied, and Chinese can be studied from the cinquième. Foreign languages are also taught through stays in foreign countries : the school of Saint-Denis makes its students take part in 4-week, total immersion stays.

The lycée in Saint-Denis offers different streams to prepare to baccalauréat :
 Littéraire (literary) with specialization in foreign languages (English, German, Spanish, Russian, Ancient Greek, Latin), specialization in mathematics or specialization in arts (arts & crafts or music)
 Scientifique (sciences) with specialization in mathematics, specialization in physics & chemistry, or specialization in earth & life science
 Économique et sociale (economics and social sciences) with specialization in foreign languages (English or German), specialization in mathematics, or specialization in economics & social sciences
 Science et technologie de la gestion (science & technology in management) with specialization in business action & communication (baccalauréat technologique)
The lycée also prepares to TOEFL and (until schoolyear 2007-2008) to the admission in the Institut d'études politiques in Paris.

Exams results 
From 2011, last year students (Terminale) of the Maison d'Éducation de la Légion d'Honneur achieve a 100% success rate in the baccalauréat with more than 60% of the students getting first-class honours (mention Très Bien) since 2014. These results made the Maison d'Éducation de la Légion d'Honneur the top-school in France in 2015, according to Le Figaro.

Organization 
The Maisons d'éducation de la Légion d'honneur are directly under the authority of the Grand Chancellor of the Légion d'honneur. The functions at the schools are called differently from in normal schools :

The Maisons d'éducation de la Légion d'honneur have as a motto "Honneur et Patrie", while French schools follow the motto of the French Republic : "Liberté, Égalité, Fraternité".

Each class is followed throughout the schoolyear by a "chargée d'éducation" ("lady in charge of education" : though the job is opened to men, actually only women do it). The lady in charge of education manages her class when they have no lessons : in homeroom, during the meals (which are served in the school refectory) and during school outings (visits at the museum, concerts, etc.). They can also give their classes pedagogical activities with the help of their teachers.

Students are accommodated in dormitories, each dormitory hosting 2 or 3 classes, which makes from 40 to 70 students. Dormitories are managed and watched by the "maîtresses d'internat" ("boarding mistresses"), who can punish students having a bad behavior at the dormitory. Punishments are noted by "crosses" (five crosses are worth extra work, ten cross a temporary change of dormitory, twenty crosses a definitive change of dormitory).

The schoolyear at the Maisons d'éducation de la Légion d'honneur contains several ceremonies : apart from the "concert présidentiel" cited above, the "lecture du rapport" is held before each school holiday, and is an announcement of all students' results. Students with good results or good behavior are awarded "medals" and a traditional party is organized until 10 p.m. for students of sixième and cinquième, until 11 p.m. for students of quatrième and troisième. At the end of the schoolyear, an awards ceremony is presided by a personality and by the Grand Chancellor of the Légion d'honneur.

Twin schools 
The Maison d'éducation de la Légion d'honneur of Saint-Denis is twinned with :
 Gymnasium Max-Joseph-Stift in Munich, Germany
 Uppingham School, England
 Odivelas Institute in Lisbon, Portugal
 Maison d'éducation de Mariama Bâ on the Gorée Island, Senegal

Trivia 
In 2002, the bicentenary of the Légion d'honneur led to a special event : during the Bastille Day Military Parade, students from the Maisons d'éducation de la Légion d'honneur formed a giant fabric puzzle representing the cross of the Légion d'honneur on the Place de la Concorde, in front of the presidential tribune. Then the students and their families were invited by the Grand Chancellor to a dinner with the Cadets of the United States Military Academy (who were also at the parade), and then watched the fireworks on the Champ de Mars.

References 
All  unless otherwise noted.

Further reading 
All  unless otherwise noted.
 Dominique Henneresse, Les maisons d'éducation de la Légion d'honneur, insignes, médailles et récompenses, Lavauezlle, 2005, 240 pages.
 Rebecca Rogers, Les demoiselles de la Légion d'honneur, Plon, 1992

External links 
All  unless otherwise noted.
 Website of Les Loges
 Website of Saint-Denis
 Section about the Maisons d'éducation de la Légion d'honneur on the Grand Chancellery of the Légion d'honneur's website

Secondary schools in France
Boarding schools in France